Supes may refer to:

 A nickname for the DC Comics superhero Superman
 A nickname for the American basketball team Seattle SuperSonics
 A fictional superhuman race in the comic book series The Boys

See also
 Supe (disambiguation)